Oak Park High School may refer to:

Oak Park High School (California), Oak Park, California
Oak Park High School (Michigan), Oak Park, Michigan
Oak Park High School (Kansas City), Kansas City, Missouri
Oak Park High School (Manitoba), Winnipeg, Manitoba
Oak Park and River Forest High School, Oak Park, Illinois

See also
Oaks Park High School, Carshalton, England
Oaks Park High School, Ilford, England